The long-toed lapwing (Vanellus crassirostris) is a species of bird in the family Charadriidae.
It is found in Angola, Botswana, Burundi, Cameroon, Chad, Democratic Republic of the Congo, Ethiopia, Kenya, Malawi, Mozambique, Namibia, Nigeria, Rwanda, South Africa, Sudan, Tanzania, Uganda, Zambia, and Zimbabwe.

Gallery

References

External links
 Long-toed plover - Species text in The Atlas of Southern African Birds.

long-toed lapwing
Birds of Sub-Saharan Africa
long-toed lapwing
Taxonomy articles created by Polbot
Taxa named by Gustav Hartlaub